William Baruch Clagett (August 12 or 13, 1854 – July 25, 1911) was a Maryland tidewater tobacco farmer. In 1892, he was appointed as tobacco inspector by Governor Frank Brown; he also served as chair of the Democratic State Central Committee. In 1894, Clagett missed election to the U.S. House of Representatives by one vote. Instead, Clagett entered politics when elected as a state senator from Prince George's County in 1897, serving from 1898 to 1901 and 1906 to 1910. Governor Austin L. Crothers appointed Clagett as the 21st Comptroller of Maryland, replacing Joshua W. Hering who had been appointed to the Maryland Public Service Commission. Clagett died of Bright's disease and was interred at Trinity Protestant Episcopal Church, in Upper Marlboro, where he had served as a vestryman. As of March 2002, Clagett's farm, Navajo, was still in operation, by the eleventh generation of his family. After descendant Charles Clagett's death in 1971, with his will having made clear that he wanted the property used for educational purposes, his estate bequeathed the farm's  to the Chesapeake Bay Foundation in 1981.

References

Notes

1854 births
1911 deaths
Comptrollers of Maryland
Maryland state senators
People from Upper Marlboro, Maryland
Deaths from nephritis
19th-century American politicians